Raimonds Krollis (born 28 October 2001) is a Latvian footballer who plays as a forward for Italian  club Spezia and the Latvia national team.

Career

Valmeiria 
Krollis joined Valmiera in 2021 and was a key part of the 2022 season title-winners, scoring twenty-four goals across the season. At the end of season awards, Krollis won award for the best Young Player of the Year, the top goal-scorer, the best striker and Player of the Season.

Spezia 
On 20 January 2023, Krollis joined Serie A club Spezia on a three-and-a-half year contract. On January 23 2023, Krollis was brought on for his first Seria A start, which he remained on the bench for the entire game. Krollis got his Serie A-debut on February 2 2023 during a 0-3 loss to Napoli. Which Krollis was substituted in during the 76' minute of the match. Since, he has broken into the Spezia team-sheet. Consistently appearing on the bench.

International Career
Krollis made his international debut for Latvia on 6 September 2020 in the UEFA Nations League against Malta.

Career statistics

International

International goals
Scores and results list Latvia's goal tally first.

Honours
Valmiera
Latvian Higher League: 2022

Individual
Virsliga Player of the Year: 2022
Ilmars Liepens Young Player of the Year: 2022
Virsliga Top Goalscorer: 2022
Virsliga Best Striker: 2022

References

External links
 
 
 International statistics at LFF.lv

2001 births
Living people
Latvian footballers
Latvia international footballers
Association football forwards
FS METTA/Latvijas Universitāte players
Valmieras FK players
Spezia Calcio players
Latvian Higher League players
Latvian expatriate footballers
Latvian expatriate sportspeople in Italy
Expatriate footballers in Italy